Sveti Rupert may refer to several places in Slovenia: 

Šentrupert, Braslovče, a settlement in the Municipality of Braslovče, known as Sveti Rupert until 1955
Šentrupert, Laško, a settlement in the Municipality of Laško, known as Sveti Rupert until 1952